Akdeniz is a municipality and district governorate in Greater Mersin, Turkey.  Mersin is one of the 30 Metropolitan centers in Turkey with more than one municipality within city borders.  Now in Mersin there are four second-level municipalities in addition to Greater Mersin (büyükşehir) municipality.

History 
Mersin was declared metropolitan centre in 1993.  In the first phase the city was divided into three parts (later four parts). The municipality of Akdeniz was established in 1993 as a secondary level municipality and the corresponding district governorate was established in 2008.

Location 
Among the other second level municipalities Toroslar is in the north and Yenişehir is in the west of Akdeniz. The south is bounded by the Mediterranean Sea and the west is bounded by Müftü River.

Population 
According to 2020 figures the population of Akdeniz was 259,381. (131,889 male and 127,492 female citizens.) Approximately 25% of Mersin citizens live in Akdeniz.

Business 
Most of government offices as well as the seats of Mersin governor and the mayor of Greater Mersin are in Akdeniz. Akdeniz also hosts most of the business quarters of the city. Mersin railway station, harbor, free port and maritime authority, as well as, shipping and customs agencies are in Akdeniz. The port of Mersin is the biggest in Turkey. It is especially used for export. In the port area there is a 100,000 tonnes grain silo and a fertiliser factory. East of Akdeniz is industrial region, with a petroleum refinery and factories of glass, cement, ferrochrome and soda.

Rural area
There are eight villages in the rural area of Akdeniz. The total population of the district is (urban and rural) 259,381

Sites of interest
Mersin Atatürk Museum
Mersin State Art and Sculpture Museum
Mersin Urban History Museum

Gallery

See also 
Huzurkent
Kazanlı
Mersin
Mersin Province
Mezitli
Yenişehir
Toroslar

References and notes

External links

Populated places in Mersin Province
Mersin
Districts of Mersin Province
Populated places in Akdeniz District